Mass automobility refers to a period (particularly in United States history), beginning in the early 20th century, where individuals had strong desires and aspirations to own an automobile. Automobility, more simply, refers to the utilization of automobiles as the major means of transportation. This phenomenon occurred primarily following the Second World War as a result of monumental social, economic, and political transformations. Americans began to move away from the city and into the suburbs, infrastructure and roads were dramatically improved, and governmental activism made travel safer and more efficient. It is argued, though, that mass automobility unintentionally fostered in hazardous pollutants due to emissions, higher mortality rates, and racial segregation in which the only beneficiary of the movement was the white middle-class.

Impact on Suburbanization
With an overlapping longing to own a home during this era, Americans looked to migrate away from the inner cities and settle in neighboring suburbs. Initially, though, inhabitants were constrained by the proximity of public transportation so that suburbs were only established within walking distance of the nearest trolley, bus, or train stop. However, thanks in large part to mass automobility, government programs, and improved road systems over time, Americans were no longer confined to these parameters and could now seek more expansive housing opportunities. Public transportation was unable to meet the new individualistic demands of the American public and, therefore, citizens hollowed out cities economically and demographically through their departure.

This mass exodus and suburbanization also piloted strip development, the formation of shopping centers, the creation of fast-food restaurants, the making of drive-in theaters, the construction of bigger and better supermarkets, and the implementation of many other concepts that are connected with the mass consumption and application of automobile use. And, further, the assembly line techniques that helped meet the demand of the automobile consumers at the time contributed to the mass production of other goods like refrigerators, washing machines, and radios.

Government Action
The government programs that facilitated suburbanization also contributed to the mass automobility crusade. First and more closely related to the housing boom, The G.I. Bill provided World War II veterans with educational services, unemployment compensation, and various loans to purchase homes and start businesses. The passing of this proposal permitted a much more accommodating attitude toward mobility and leaving the city. Secondly, the Federal Aid Highway Act of 1956, signed into law by Dwight D. Eisenhower, authorized the expenditure of  billion for the construction of 41,000 miles of the Interstate Highway System. The bill was originally designed for prompt evacuation and movement purposes in the event of a war in the United States and was the largest civil engineering project in human history at the time. This act now represents an immense political and financial commitment to a car and truck based land transportation society. It made travel easier and cost-effective, and greatly expedited the transfer of goods, people, information, and ideas.

In addition to these factors, some other influencing issues with government involvement that allowed for such great automobility during this time were high tariffs on foreign products, the high availability of domestic petroleum, and low fuel prices.

Negative Consequences
There were some negative consequences associated with mass automobility as well. The emissions from cars left the country under a blanket of smog and led to some regulatory actions and standards from the government like the Clean Air Act in 1963 and 1970. Other safety legislation was passed to make cars more reliable and sounder after death rates were overwhelming and devastating. And, lastly, because owning an automobile and a home was a symbol of social status and wealth, the mass depopulation of inner cities of the white middle-class was accelerated by the movement which increased racial discrimination.

See also
 Automobile dependency
 Cycling mobility
 History of the United States (1945–1964)

References
Featherstone, Mike. "Automobilities: An Introduction." Theory, Culture, and Society 21.4/5 (2004): 1-24.
Rajan, Sudhir Chella. "The Enigma of Automobility: Democratic Politics and Pollution Control." Pittsburgh: University of Pittsburgh Press, 1996.
Volti, Rudi. "A Century of Automobility." Technology and Culture. 4th ed. Vol. 37. Baltimore: Johns Hopkins UP, 1996. 663–85. JSTOR. Web. 24 Feb. 2011. https://www.jstor.org/stable/3107094 .
Walsh, Margaret. "Gender and the Automobile in the United States." Automobile In American Life and Society. University of Michigan, 2004. Web. 25 Feb. 2011. http://www.autolife.umd.umich.edu/Gender/Walsh/G_Overview1.htm .

Road transportation in the United States